Topmodel is a Belgian reality television show which pits contestants against each other in a variety of competitions to determine who will win a modeling contract with Dominique Models. Belgian model Ingrid Seynhaeve hosts the show, which is based on the top-rating series America's Next Top Model with Tyra Banks.

The debut season of the show premiered on KanaalTwee in October 2007. On it, 10 female contestants were placed in an apartment. Spanning a wide variety of women of various races, heights and body sizes, they had been whittled down from a pool of thousands to compete against one another in various contests designed to simulate the extreme demands placed on professional models. Each week one contestant was eliminated by a panel of judges: Ingrid Seynhaeve herself, fashion expert Ghislaine Nuytten, model Elise Crombez and Monique Vanendert, photographer. Coaches are Lieve Gerrits who's a stylist, Aza Declercq as acting coach and Vasko Todorof, make up artist.

The second season premiered one year after the start of season 1 in October 2008 on new network 2BE. An Lemmens replaced Ingrid Seynhaeve as the host of the show. The jury consisted of Marc Douchez from Dominique Models, visagist Rudi Cremers, fashion journalist Els De Pauw, Pascale Belden and again Ghislaine Nuytten, now as the head of the panel of judges. The cast was increased from 10 to 12.

Cycles

See also
Benelux' Next Top Model

References

External links
 Official site

Belgium
2007 Belgian television series debuts
2008 Belgian television series endings
Belgian reality television series
Belgian television series based on American television series
VTM 2 original programming